Matthew Puempel (born January 24, 1993) is a Canadian professional ice hockey player who is currently playing for the Augsburger Panther of the Deutsche Eishockey Liga (DEL). Puempel was selected 24th overall in the 2011 NHL Entry Draft by the Ottawa Senators.

Playing career

Amateur
Puempel's 2009–10 season was a noteworthy rookie OHL season. Playing for the Peterborough Petes, he led all OHL rookies in goals and points and was second on his team in scoring. His point totals landed him at 39th in overall league scoring and he won the Emms Family Award as well as the CHL Rookie of the Year award. In his second season with the Petes, he was hampered by a back injury just before the season and a bone chip on his hip that required surgery and ended his season prematurely.

On December 8, 2011, Puempel was suspended for 8 games for a hit to the head of forward Sebastian Uvira during a game against the Oshawa Generals. On June 27, 2012, Puempel requested a trade to a contending team and was subsequently dealt to the Kitchener Rangers. "Being around Ottawa and this being my last year of junior, I wanted to win and be a part of a team that is in a different phase of a rebuild," he told the Peterborough Examiner.

Professional
Eager for the chance to select Puempel, Ottawa traded a pair of second-round picks (35th and 48th overall) to Detroit in order to obtain the 24th overall spot in the draft. Puempel signed an entry level contract with the Senators on December 29, 2011. He made his professional debut with the Binghamton Senators late in the 2011–12 season. In his first full professional season in 2013–14, Puempel scored 30 goals, tying Mike Hoffman for the Binghamton team goal scoring lead.

In the midst of his second full professional season in Binghamton, Puempel was recalled to Ottawa on February 19, 2015. At the time, he ranked third in Binghamton team scoring with 32 points (12 goals and 20 assists) in 51 regular-season games. On March 10, 2015, Puempel scored his first NHL goal against Tuukka Rask of the Boston Bruins.

In the 2016–17 season, Puempel made the Senators opening night roster. After 13 scoreless games, and relegated to a healthy scratch on occasions, Puempel was placed on waivers by the Senators on November 20, 2016. He was claimed the following day by the New York Rangers.

Puempel recorded his first career hat trick in a 6–3 Rangers win against the Arizona Coyotes on December 29, 2016. All three of Puempel's goals were scored on the power play. On June 14, 2017, the Rangers re-signed Puempel to a one-year extension.

In the lead up to the 2017–18 season, Puempel was assigned to the Rangers' AHL affiliate, the Hartford Wolf Pack, after clearing waivers. On October 21, 2017, Puempel was traded to the Detroit Red Wings in exchange for Ryan Sproul. During the season, Puempel, along with teammate Matt Lorito, were the only two Grand Rapids Griffins players selected to play in the 2018 AHL All-Star Classic game. On September 9, 2018, the Red Wings signed Puempel to a two-year contract extension. On March 22, 2019, Puempel was recalled by the Red Wings. Prior to being recalled, he recorded 24 goals and 26 assists in 59 games for the Griffins. He made his debut for the Red Wings the next night in a game against the Vegas Golden Knights. During the 2018–19 season, Puempel recorded one goal in eight games for the Red Wings. Following the completion of the Red Wings' season, he was reassigned to the Griffins.

After going unsigned through the start of the 2020–21 season, Puempel signed his first contract overseas, agreeing to a deal with the Malmö Redhawks of the SHL on January 16, 2021.

Personal life
Born in Windsor, Puempel was raised in Essex, Ontario with his older brother Mike. He attended Thomas A. Stewart Secondary School while playing for the Petes where he earned OHL Academic Player of the Month for the East Division in January 2010.

Career statistics

Regular season and playoffs

International

Awards and honours

References

External links 

1993 births
Living people
Augsburger Panther players
Binghamton Senators players
Canadian ice hockey left wingers
Detroit Red Wings players
Grand Rapids Griffins players
Hartford Wolf Pack players
Ice hockey people from Ontario
Kitchener Rangers players
Malmö Redhawks players
National Hockey League first-round draft picks
New York Rangers players
Ottawa Senators draft picks
Ottawa Senators players
People from Essex, Ontario
Peterborough Petes (ice hockey) players
Sportspeople from Windsor, Ontario